Winston Guy Jr. (born April 23, 1990) is a former American football safety. He played college football at Kentucky. Guy was drafted by the Seattle Seahawks in the sixth round of the 2012 NFL Draft. He has also played for the Jacksonville Jaguars and Indianapolis Colts.

Professional career

Seattle Seahawks
Guy was selected in the sixth round (181st overall) by the Seattle Seahawks in the 2012 NFL Draft. On August 31, 2013, Guy was released by the Seahawks during final team cuts.

Jacksonville Jaguars
Guy was claimed off waivers by the Jacksonville Jaguars on September 1, 2013. After starting at safety the first three weeks of 2014 season, he was released on September 29, 2014.

Indianapolis Colts
On October 3, 2014, Guy was signed to the Colts' practice squad.

He was released by the Colts on September 20, 2016.

Statistics
Source: NFL.com

References

1990 births
Living people
Players of American football from Lexington, Kentucky
Lexington Catholic High School alumni
American football safeties
Kentucky Wildcats football players
Seattle Seahawks players
Jacksonville Jaguars players
Indianapolis Colts players